Miranda (born 1976), is an American singer songwriter from Burbank, California.  Her sole 1994, techno pop music hit was "Your Love is So Divine" peaked at #66 on the United States, Hot 100.

References 

20th-century American women singers
20th-century American singers
1976 births
Living people
Date of birth missing (living people)
Singers from California